The Governor of Neuquén is a citizen of the Neuquén Province, in Argentina, holding the office of governor for the corresponding period. The governor is elected alongside a vice-governor. Currently the governor of Neuquén is Omar Gutiérrez.

Governors since 1983

See also
 Legislature of Neuquén

References

 
Neuquén Province
Neuquén Province